D'lectrified is the eighth studio album by American country music singer Clint Black, released on September 28, 1999. It is also the first album in Black's career that he produced by himself.

The album was recorded entirely without electric instruments, hence the title. "There is not a single electric instrument on the album, but you wouldn't know it unless you were told. It is truly, totally unplugged," said Black. It was recorded entirely in ten weeks, "the fastest I'd ever done an album".

The album is an eclectic mix of material. In addition to a selection of new songs, it contains a number of cover versions, including a version of Waylon Jennings' "Are You Sure Hank Done It This Way", Monty Python's "Galaxy Song", The Marshall Tucker Band's "Bob Away My Blues" and Leon Russell's "Dixie Lullaby". It also has several collaborations, including the hits "When I Said I Do", a duet with Black's wife, Lisa Hartman Black, and "Been There", a duet with his friend Steve Wariner. Black also rearranged and re-recorded three previous songs of his own in the album's bluesier style.

While not as commercially successful as many of his other works, D'lectrified still became Black's eighth album to be certified gold by the RIAA.

Track listing

Personnel

Musical credits 
Clint Black — lead vocals, background vocals, acoustic guitar, harmonica, bass harmonica, recorder
Lisa Hartman-Black — vocals on "When I Said I Do"
Lenny Castro — percussion, tambourine, washboard
Steve Dorff — string arrangements, choir arrangements
Jerry Douglas — Dobro
Stuart Duncan — fiddle
Skip Ewing — acoustic guitar
Gary Grant — trumpet
Larry Herbstritt — conductor
Jerry Hey — trumpet
Dan Higgins — baritone saxophone
Bruce Hornsby — grand piano on "Dixie Lullaby" and "No Time to Kill", vocals on "Dixie Lullaby"
Eric Idle — vocals on "Outside Intro (To Galaxy Song)"
Waylon Jennings — vocals on "Are You Sure Waylon Done It This Way"
Abraham Laboriel — acoustic bass
Kenny Loggins — vocals on "Harmony"
Kevin Nealon — banjo, 5-string banjo
Hayden Nicholas — 12-string guitar, 12-string bass guitar
Bobbi Page — background vocals
Dean Parks — acoustic guitar, slide guitar, classical guitar, resonator guitar
Joel Peskin — clarinet, tenor saxophone
Steve Real — background vocals
Bill Reichenbach Jr. — trombone
John Robinson — drums
Ray Rogers — tenor banjo
Matt Rollings — piano, grand piano
Marty Stuart — mandolin
Steve Wariner — acoustic guitar and vocals on "Been There" and "Where Your Love Won't Go"
Lawrence L. Williams — baritone saxophone
Edgar Winter — alto saxophone

Production 
Clint Black — producer, engineer
Jeff Basso — engineer
Zack Berry — production coordinator
Ricky Cobble — recorder, engineer
Greg Collins — mixing assistant
Steve Genewick — assistant engineer
Richard Hanson — engineer, engineering support
Julian King — recorder, engineer, mixing
Matt Price — assistant engineer
Ray Rogers — engineer, engineering support
Doug Sax — mastering, max
James Stroud — executive producer
Tom Sweeney — mixing assistant
Simon Tassano — recorder, engineer
Dann Thompson — assistant engineer

Charts

Weekly charts

Year-end charts

Singles

References 

D'lectrified [CD liner notes]. 1999. RCA Records.
[ D'lectrified Credits]. Allmusic. Retrieved on January 5, 2007.
[ Artist Chart History (Singles)]. Billboard. Retrieved on January 1, 2007.
[ Artist Chart History (Albums)]. Billboard. Retrieved on January 1, 2007.

1999 albums
Clint Black albums
RCA Records albums
Albums produced by Clint Black